Elections to Peterborough City Council took place on 6 May 2021. 23 of the 60 seats were contested. The election was held alongside the elections for the Cambridgeshire Police and Crime Commissioner and Mayor of Cambridgeshire and Peterborough.

Current political makeup
 Conservative: 13 defences (14 other seats)
 Labour and Co-op: 3 defences (14 other seats)
 Lib Dem: 3 defences (7 other seats)
 Werrington First: 1 defence (2 other seats)
 Liberal: 1 defence (0 other seats)
 Green 0 defences (2 other seats)

Summary

Ward results
(* indicates sitting councillor)

Barnack

This seat was last contested in 2016.

Bretton

This seat was last contested in 2019. Green (5.7% in 2019) did not contest this time.

Central

This seat was last contested in 2019. UKIP (5.1% in 2019) did not contest this time.

Dogsthorpe

The incumbent, Chris Ash (Liberal Party), is not seeking re-election. This seat was last contested in 2019. Veterans and People's Party (5.1% in 2019) did not contest this time.

East

The incumbent, Azher Iqbal (CON) was not seeking re-election. This seat was last contested in 2019.

Eye, Thorney & Newborough

This seat was last contested in 2019. UKIP (14.8% in 2019) and SDP (7.9% in 2019) did not contest this time.

Fletton & Stanground

The incumbent, James Lillis (Lib Dem), was not seeking re-election. This seat was last contested in 2019. UKIP (16.0% in 2019) did not contest this time, although the previous candidate stood as an independent.

Fletton & Woodston

One vacant seat is up for election, alongside the incumbent.

Glinton & Castor

The incumbent was outgoing Council Leader John Holdich (CON). This seat was last contested in 2019.

Gunthorpe

The incumbent was Darren Fower, elected  as a Lib Dem, but sitting as Labour. He did not seek re-election. This seat was last contested in 2019. UKIP (9.3% in 2019) and Green (3.6% in 2019) did not contest this time.

Hampton Vale

The incumbent David Seaton (CON), was not seeking re-election. This seat was last contested in 2019. Green (5.4% in 2019) did not contest this time.

Hargate & Hempsted

This was a vacant seat due to the death of the sitting Conservative councillor. This seat was last contested in 2019.

North

The incumbent Mohammed Nadeem (CON), was not seeking re-election. This seat was last contested in 2019. UKIP (9.9% in 2019) did not contest this time.

Orton Longueville

This seat was last contested in 2019. UKIP (16.7% in 2019) did not contest this time.

Orton Waterville

The incumbent Kim Aitken (CON), was not seeking re-election. This seat was last contested in 2019.

Park

The incumbent was Labour group leader. This seat was last contested in 2019. Green (5.8% in 2019) did not contest this time.

Paston & Walton

The incumbent was the Liberal Democrat group leader. This seat was last contested in 2019. UKIP (15.5% in 2019) and Green (4.5% in 2019) did not contest this time.

Ravensthorpe

This seat was last contested in 2019. UKIP (12.7% in 2019) did not contest this time.

Stanground South

This seat was last contested in 2019. UKIP (17.8% in 2019) did not contest this time.

Werrington

This seat was last contested in 2019.

West

This seat was last contested in 2019.

Wittering

The incumbent Diane Lamb (CON), was not seeking re-election. This seat was last contested in 2016.

References

2021
Peterborough
2020s in Cambridgeshire